Touché is the fifth and final studio album by Australian pop group Hush. The album was released in July 1977 peaked at No. 36 on the Australian charts.

Track listing

Charts

References 

1977 albums
Hush (band) albums
Pop rock albums by Australian artists